Ivanovka is a rural locality (a village) in Nizhnebaltachevsky Selsoviet, Tatyshlinsky District, Bashkortostan, Russia. The population was 142 as of 2010. There are 3 streets.

Geography 
Ivanovka is located 27 km southeast of Verkhniye Tatyshly (the district's administrative centre) by road. Stary Kyzyl-Yar is the nearest rural locality.

References 

Rural localities in Tatyshlinsky District